Graham Connell (born 31 October 1974) is a Scottish footballer who played 'senior' for Clydebank, Partick Thistle, Queen's Park, Queen of the South, Berwick Rangers, Dumbarton and Stenhousemuir.

In 1989 he was pictured, as Young Footballer of the Year, with footballing legend Pele at Hampden Park.

References

1974 births
Scottish footballers
Dumbarton F.C. players
Clydebank F.C. (1965) players
Partick Thistle F.C. players
Queen's Park F.C. players
Queen of the South F.C. players
Berwick Rangers F.C. players
Stenhousemuir F.C. players
Scottish Football League players
Living people
Association football midfielders